Stictoleptura trisignata is a species of longhorn beetle in the Lepturinae subfamily. It was described by Léon Fairmaire in 1852. It can be found in France, Portugal and Spain.

References

Stictoleptura
Beetles described in 1852
Beetles of Europe